Põgari-Sassi is a village in Ridala Parish, Lääne County, in western Estonia.

History
On 22 September 1944 the last session of the Otto Tief's cabinet (EVRK) took place in the house of prayer in Põgari. Later the Secretary of State Helmut Maandi escaped through Tauksi, Liialaid and the Hiiumaa Islets to Sweden.

Gallery

References

Villages in Lääne County